Adam Little (1 September 1919 – 12 June 2008) was a Scottish football player who played during the 1940s and 1950s for Rangers and Morton. Little was also a fully qualified doctor.

Career
Little was born in Blantyre and educated at Rutherglen Academy. It was while playing for the school team that he was scouted by then Rangers manager Bill Struth and the next day signed for the club aged 17. Struth decided to loan Little out to play for Blantyre Victoria to get much needed experience.

He returned to Rangers and played six first-team games after the Second World War. The war had interrupted his footballing career.  Little served as a captain in the Royal Army Medical Corps. Upon returning to Rangers he made six top team appearances before moving to Greenock with Morton for a spell then retiring from professional football.

Little also guested for Arsenal during the war.

References
Article – WW2 Peoples War
Independent obituary
Article – FollowFollow.com
Scotsman obituary

Scottish footballers
Association football midfielders
Scottish Football League players
People educated at Rutherglen Academy
Rangers F.C. players
Arsenal F.C. wartime guest players
Greenock Morton F.C. players
Royal Army Medical Corps officers
20th-century Scottish medical doctors
1919 births
2008 deaths
Blantyre Victoria F.C. players
Scotland wartime international footballers
People from Blantyre, South Lanarkshire
Scottish Junior Football Association players
British Army personnel of World War II